The Ministry of Coal is an Indian government ministry headquartered in New Delhi. The portfolio is held by Cabinet Minister Pralhad Joshi.

The Ministry of Coal is charged with exploration of coal and lignite reserves in India, production, supply, distribution and price of coal through the government-owned corporations Coal India Limited and its subsidiaries, as well as Neyveli Lignite Corporation.

The Ministry of Coal also manages the Union Government's 49 percent equity participation in Singareni Collieries Company, a public sector undertaking that is a joint venture with Government of Telangana. in which equity is held partly by the State Government of Telangana (51%) and the Government of India.

Ministers of Coal

List of Ministers of State

Organisations

Central Public Sector Undertakings
Coal India
Neyveli Lignite Corporation

Statutory Bodies 
Coal Mines Provident Fund Organisation (CMPFO)
Coal Mines Welfare Organisation
Commissioner Of Payments
COAL CONTROLLER'S ORGANIZATION (CCO)

Functions And Responsibilities

The Ministry of Coal is responsible for development and exploitation of coal and lignite reserves in India. The subjects allocated to the Ministry which include attached and sub-ordinate or other organisations including PSUs concerned with their subjects under the Government of India (Allocation of Business) Rules, 1961, as amended from time to time, are as follows:

 Exploration and development of coking coal and non-coking coal and lignite deposits in India
 All matters relating to production, supply, distribution and prices of coal
 Development and operation of coal washeries other than those for which Department of Steel (ISPAT Vibhag) is responsible
 Low-Temperature carbonisation of coal and production of synthetic oil from coal
 Administration of the Coal Mines (Conservation and Development) Act, 1974 (28 of 1974)
 The Coal Mines Provident Fund Organisation
 The Coal Mines Welfare Organisation
 Administration of the Coal Mines Provident Fund and Miscellaneous Provision Act, 1948 (46 of 1948)
 Administration of the Coal Mines Labour Welfare Fund Act, 1947 (32 of 1947)
 Rules under the Mines Act, 1952 (32 of 1952) for the levy and collection of duty of excise on coke and coal produced and dispatched from mines and administration of rescue fund
Administration of the Coal Bearing Areas (Acquisition and Development) Act, 1957 (20 of 1957)

References

 
Coal